The Anand class tugboats are a series of service watercraft built by Goa Shipyard Limited (earlier part of Mazagon Dock Limited, Bombay), for the Indian Navy. Tugs of this class have a 6-tonne bollard pull.

Ships of the class

Specification
Gross Tonnage: 100 tonnes
DWT: 13 tonnes

See also
Tugboats of the Indian Navy

References

Ships of the Indian Navy
Auxiliary ships of the Indian Navy
Tugs of the Indian Navy
Auxiliary tugboat classes